Nagmati River is a river in western India in Gujarat whose origin is Near Bharapar village in Kutch. Its basin has a maximum length of 50 km. The total catchment area of the basin is 135 km2.

નાગમતી ઃ ભુજંગ નાગની સ્મૃતિમાં આ નામ અપાયું છે, ભૂરિયો ગાડી અને ભુજંગ નાગની કથામાં ભૂરિયાનું મૃત્યુ થયેલું એવી દંતકથા છે.

References

Rivers of Gujarat
Rivers of India